The following television stations broadcast on digital or analog channel 18 in Canada:

 CFRN-TV-8 in Grouard Mission, Alberta
 CHWM-TV-1 in Whistler, British Columbia
 CICO-DT-18 in London, Ontario
 CIHF-TV-4 in Truro, Nova Scotia
 CJPC-DT in Rimouski, Quebec

18 TV stations in Canada